Catherine Zuber is a costume designer for the Broadway theater and opera, among other venues.  She is a graduate of the Yale School of Drama, and has been referred to as "one of theater's most sought-after costume designers on both coasts."

Life and early career
Zuber was born in England, and came with her family to New York City when she was 9 years old.  Her first choice of career was photography, but she switched to costume design because she found photography to be "a lonely art form". In addition, she enjoyed the collaborative nature of working in the theatre.

Broadway 
Zuber's Broadway credits include How to Succeed in Business Without Really Trying (Tony nomination), Born Yesterday (Tony nomination), Women on the Verge of a Nervous Breakdown, South Pacific (Tony Award), The Coast of Utopia (Tony Award), The Light in the Piazza (Tony Award), Edward Albee's Seascape (Tony nomination), Awake and Sing! (Tony Award), Joe Turner's Come and Gone (Outer Critics Circle nomination), The Royal Family (Tony Award, Outer Critics Circle nomination), Oleanna, A Man for All Seasons, Cry-Baby, Mauritius, Doubt, Little Women, Dracula, Frozen, Dinner at Eight (Tony, Outer Critics Circle and Drama Desk nominations), Twelfth Night (Tony and Drama Desk nominations), Ivanov, Triumph of Love (Drama Desk nomination), The Sound of Music and The Red Shoes among others.

Opera 
Zuber's opera credits include Le comte Ory, Il Barbiere di Siviglia, Doctor Atomic, The 125th Anniversary Gala, Les Contes d'Hoffmann (The Metropolitan Opera), Two Boys, Carmen (ENO), Roméo et Juliette (Salzburger Festspiele), and Der Ring des Nibelungen (Washington National Opera and San Francisco Opera).

Off-Broadway 
Zuber's Off-Broadway credits include BAM/Old Vic's, The Bridge Project consisting of The Cherry Orchard (2009), The Winter's Tale (2009), As You Like It (2010), The Tempest (2010) and Richard III (2012),

She has designed costumes for some 57 Off-Broadway plays and musicals, recently including Oslo in 2016 at Lincoln Center Theater and Incognito in 2016 at the Manhattan Theatre Club New York City Center-Stage I.

Awards and nominations 
Zuber has been nominated 15 times for a Tony Award, and has won eight times. In addition, she received the 2003 and 2004 Henry Hewes Award for Outstanding Costume Design.

Other 

Her other work includes Fête des Vignerons (1999 Vevey, Switzerland).

References

External links
 
 
 

American costume designers
Women costume designers
Drama Desk Award winners
Tony Award winners
Yale School of Drama alumni
Living people
Year of birth missing (living people)
English emigrants to the United States